Lipowiec may refer to:

 Lipowiec, Kuyavian-Pomeranian Voivodeship (north-central Poland)
 Lipowiec, Biłgoraj County in Lublin Voivodeship (east Poland)
 Lipowiec, Lower Silesian Voivodeship (south-west Poland)
 Lipowiec, Tomaszów Lubelski County in Lublin Voivodeship (east Poland)
 Lipowiec, Masovian Voivodeship (east-central Poland)
 Lipówiec, Masovian Voivodeship (east-central Poland)
 Lipowiec, Greater Poland Voivodeship (west-central Poland)
 Lipowiec, Silesian Voivodeship (south Poland)
 Lipowiec, Kartuzy County in Pomeranian Voivodeship (north Poland)
 Lipowiec, Subcarpathian Voivodeship (south-east Poland)
 Lipowiec, Nowe Miasto County in Warmian-Masurian Voivodeship (north Poland)
 Lipowiec, Ostróda County in Warmian-Masurian Voivodeship (north Poland)
 Lipowiec, Szczytno County in Warmian-Masurian Voivodeship (north Poland)
 Gmina Lipowiec Kościelny
 Lipowiec Kościelny
 Lipowiec Mały
 Lipowiec-Kolonia
 Nowy Lipowiec
 Stary Lipowiec
 Lipowiec, Ustroń

See also 
 Majdan Lipowiecki, a village
 Lipovec (disambiguation)
 Lipowice